Taskinen is a Finnish surname. Notable people with the surname include:

 Antti Taskinen (born 1976) Finnish double-murderer
 Heikki Taskinen (1888–1952), Finnish farmer and politician
 Heikki Taskinen (athlete) (1905–1988), Finnish athlete
 Heimo Taskinen (born 1947); Finnish ski-orienteering competitor
 Markku Taskinen (born 1952), Finnish athlete
 Vili Taskinen (1874–1930), Finnish farmer and politician
 Vitali Taskinen (born 1986) Finnish ice hockey goaltender

Finnish-language surnames